Francis Alexander Tarleton (1841–1920) was an Irish mathematician and author who was Professor of Natural Philosophy at Trinity College Dublin (TCD) from 1890 to 1902.

Life and career
Tarleton was born in county Monaghan, Ireland and was educated at TCD (Scholar 1860, BA 1861, MA 1865) where he spent his entire career.  While at TCD he served as bursar, senior dean, and vice provost, and was awarded an honorary ScD in 1891. He wrote several books on dynamics and the mathematical theory of attraction. He was active in the posing and solving of mathematical problems in the Educational Times and was called to the bar in 1868. He served as President of the Royal Irish Academy from 1906 to 1911.

Books
 1884: An Elementary Treatise on Dynamics, containing applications to thermodynamics, with numerous examples written with Benjamin Williamson, (Longmans, Green, and Co.)
 1899: An Introduction to the Mathematical Theory of Attraction, Vol. I  (Longmans, Green, and Co.)
 1913: An Introduction to the Mathematical Theory of Attraction, Vol. II (Longmans, Green, and Co.)

References

External links
Census Years 1901 Dublin: Tarleton, Francis Alexander The National Archives of Ireland

19th-century Irish mathematicians
Academics of Trinity College Dublin
Alumni of Trinity College Dublin
Fellows of Trinity College Dublin
Presidents of the Royal Irish Academy
Scholars of Trinity College Dublin
1841 births
1920 deaths